Yojimbo is a 1961 film directed by Akira Kurosawa and starring Toshiro Mifune.

Yojimbo may also refer to:

 Yojimbo (software), an information organizer for Mac OS X
 Yojimbo (Final Fantasy), a character in Final Fantasy X

See also
 Usagi Yojimbo, a comic book
 Yo-Jin-Bo, a visual novel about three yojinbo